Ullrich, is a German surname of Germanic origin. Other variants include Ulrich, Ulrych/Ullrych, Ulryk/Ullryk, and many more.

Notable people with the surname include:

Alexander Ulrich (born 1971), German politician
Anton Ullrich (1826–1895), German industrialist and inventor
Artur Ullrich, German footballer
Axel Ullrich (born 1943), German cancer researcher
Cornelia Ullrich (born 1963), German hurdler
Dave Ullrich, Canadian musician and entrepreneur
Egon Ullrich(de) (1902–1957), German mathematician
Frank Ullrich (born 1958), German biathlete and Olympic medalist
Franz Ullrich (1830–1891), German industrialist
Gerald Ullrich (born 1962), German politician
Jan Ullrich (born 1973), German professional road bicycle racer
Kay Ullrich (born 1943), Scottish politician
Sandy Ullrich (1921–2001), Cuban professional baseball pitcher
Stephanie Ullrich (born 1984), German football goalkeeper
Volker Ullrich (born 1975), German politician

See also 
 Ulrich
 Ulric (disambiguation)
 Ulrici
 Ultsch
 Utz (name)

German-language surnames
Surnames from given names